Yargo is the name of several villages in Burkina Faso, including the following:

 Yargo, Boulkiemdé
 Yargo, Kombissiri
 Yargo, Toece
 Yargo, also Yorgo Kosyama, located at 
 Yargo, located at 
 Yargo, located at 
 Yargo, located at 
 Yargo, also called Iarogo, located at 
 Yargo, located at 
 Yargo, located at 
 Yargo, located at 
 Yargo, located at 
 Yargo, located at 
 Yargo, located at 
 Yargo, located at 
 Yargo, located at 
 Yargo, located at 
 Yargo, located at 
 Yargo, located at 
 Galo, also called Yargo, located at 
 Yargo Kiongo, also called Yargo, located at 
 Yargo, located at 
 Yargo, located at 
 Yargo, located at

References

Populated places in Burkina Faso